Santa Clara Canton is a canton of Ecuador, located in the Pastaza Province.  Its capital is the town of Santa Clara.  Its population at the 2001 census was 3,029.

References

Cantons of Pastaza Province